The Executive Council of Kano is a constitutional organ which exercises executive power in the Nigerian administrative unit of Kano State. It often make decisions via Orders in Council.

Executive councilors are informally called "state ministers or commissioners", the exception being the Council of the Third Republic which had "State secretaries". The Council is presided over by a Governor, Deputy Governor or a senior minister acting with the powers of the Governor.

Councils

References

Politics of Nigeria
Kano State